Honey Loops is a breakfast cereal made by Kellogg's and sold in the United Kingdom, Sweden, Spain, India, The Netherlands, Malta, Ireland, Italy, Germany, Russia, Belgium and Poland. The mascot of Honey Loops was a male honeybee called Loopy, who has now been replaced by a female bee called Honey B (primarily as the mascot of Honey Pops). The cereal was originally marketed as "Honey Nut Loops", but the name was changed when nuts were dropped from the ingredients in 1998. The commercials for the original product explicitly mentioned the "crunchy nuts" it used to contain.

In Brazil, Argentina and Chile the cereal was marketed as "Honey Nutos", but as of February 2015 it is no longer produced or sold. In Italy, France, Russia and Spain the cereal is marketed as "Miel Pops" and it has also another version as honey-balls. In Austria, the cereal is called "Honey Bsss Loops". It was discontinued in India as well after years of production.

Miel Pops Commercial meme
In July 2020, the Miel Pops Russian intro became a viral Internet meme on TikTok featuring a dancing llama. The viral song is an edit of a cover of the Miel Pops theme by Armenian-Russian aspiring singer Rozalia in May 2020. Many Spanish speakers misinterpreted the lyrics from Russian, with many interpreting the word "Miel Pops" as "Mi Pan", Spanish for "My bread". Many from all over the world would use the sound with the dancing llama, referring to Miel Pops. The lyrics were "Miel Pops, Zoom Zoom Zoom, Zoom Zoom Zoom. Miel Pops akacutny Nyam Nyam Nyam." The sound is one of the most used to this day, used by popular tik-toker Joesphine Grey.

Ingredients

 Cereal Flours (Whole Oats, Whole Wheat, Whole Barley, Whole Rye, Corn)
 Sugar
 Honey (4.5%)
 Glucose Syrup
 Salt
 Tricalcium Phosphate
 Flavouring
 Niacin
 Iron
 Colour (mixed Carotenes)
 Vitamin B6
 Riboflavin (B2)
 Thiamin (B1)
 Folic Acid
 Antioxidant (Ascorbyl Palmitate, Alpha Tocopherol)
 Vitamin B12

References

External links
 

Kellogg's cereals